The CRC Brakleen 150 is a  annual race on the NASCAR Camping World Truck Series calendar at the Pocono Raceway.

History
The inaugural race was run on July 31, 2010. The race was most notable for its qualifying procedure, with more than two cars running at the same time on the track. The inaugural winner was Elliott Sadler who became the 21st NASCAR driver to win in all three series.

The event marked the first time that the Truck Series raced in the state of Pennsylvania since 2001 at the now defunct Nazareth Speedway, and the first time that two of the three major NASCAR divisions now raced at Pocono since from 1974 to 2009 it was only the Cup Series that raced there. 

In early 2019, NASCAR announced significant changes to the 2020 schedules for all three divisions at Pocono, with the NASCAR Cup Series running a doubleheader on Saturday and Sunday. The Truck race, which remained at 150 miles in length, was run on Saturday. However due to rain, the event was postponed to Sunday morning.

Past winners

Notes
2010–11 and 2013–15: The race was extended due to a NASCAR Overtime finish. 2010 and 2013 took 2 attempts at overtime. 2015 took all 3 attempts at overtime.
2011: Race stopped after 17 laps on August 6 due to rain, race completed on August 7.
2020: Race postponed from June 27 to June 28 due to rain. Started just after 9:30 in the morning due to a tighter schedule. Xfinity event and second Cup event started almost immediately. Earliest start time for Truck event since Homestead in 2005, which was also postponed due to rain and run in the morning.

Multiple winners (drivers)

Multiple winners (teams)

Manufacturer wins

References

External links
 
 CRC Industries, Inc.

NASCAR Truck Series races
 
Annual sporting events in the United States
Recurring sporting events established in 2010
2010 establishments in Pennsylvania